Football at the 1956 Summer Olympics may refer to:

Association football at the 1956 Summer Olympics
Australian football at the 1956 Summer Olympics